Louis King (1898–1962) was an American actor and film director.

Louis King may also refer to:

Louis King (basketball) (born 1999), American professional basketball player for  the Westchester Knicks
Lewis King or Curt Weiss (born 1959), American musician
Louis Eugene King (1898–1981), anthropologist
Louis Vessot King (1874–1965), Canadian academic and physicist
Louis Magrath King, British consul and author
Louis King (Shortland Street), fictional character of New Zealand soap opera/drama Shortland Street